Harry Lorraine (26 March 1885 – 27 March 1970), born Harry Albert Heard in Brighton, Sussex, England, was an actor in English silent films.

Early life

Harry Heard was the oldest of three children born to Thomas Heard and Harriett (née Ashdown). At age 16 he was working as a painter for his father, but then established himself as a magician, daredevil, and escapologist, sometimes with the spelling Harry Herd, as "The world’s youngest Handcuff King," an English version of Harry Houdini, although it's uncertain whether he met Houdini or saw him perform.

Acting career

Heard began his film career in 1912 and used the name Harry Lorraine throughout his acting career. It appears to have been strictly a stage name, as he used the surname Heard on his marriage certificate in 1932, and there is no known documentation of a legal name change.

Lorraine's first acting role was Little John in Robin Hood Outlawed. The next month, he took the lead role of Lieutenant Rose in Lieutenant Rose and the Train Wreckers. In this movie, typical for the time period, Lorraine's character is traveling on a train which has been directed to a siding by the enemy, and – all while the smallest slip means certain death – as the train is hurtling along, he climbs out of the carriage, swings himself between two coaches, and disconnects the couplings, thereby saving the day by sending on the bulk of the train to destruction while his own carriage remains safely on the track.

Lorraine did his own stunts in movies, drawing on his natural strength and the physical skills he had developed prior to acting. During a time when it seemed audiences wanted more and every action movie had to outdo previous movies – and with only visual effects and music – some were quite challenging and even dangerous. Examples of some of the daredevil stunts Lorraine performed include diving into a pool of sharks (filming on location in Jamaica), being thrown bound hand and foot from Walton Bridge into the river thirty feet below, fighting six men single-handedly and getting thrown down onto a table with such force that it splintered (this was an unrehearsed and unexpected thrill), jumping from an airplane, dangling from the jib of a very tall crane while bound, being dragged by a taxicab, and sundry chase scenes.

Lorraine's acting career spanned three decades, and its end probably had as much to do with the near-standstill of the British film industry during World War II as with his advancing age for the types of characters he usually played.

Personal life

In 1932, Lorraine married Gladys Seals in Kingston. His name was recorded as Harry Heard on the marriage certificate. He was forty-five years old and his occupation was listed as film director; she was twenty-four. Gladys used the name Tonie throughout her life. They had two boys, both born in Staines, whose surnames were registered as both Heard and Lorraine, and adopted to use the surname Lorraine.

The British film industry was decimated by the effects of World War II, and after the war Lorraine left acting to manage his father’s building business. Known as Lorraine Estates, it was initially involved in repairing bomb damage to property in Battersea and other sites in and around London. Lorraine continued working in the building business almost until his death at age 85 on 27 March 1970, and was recorded as "film director (retired)" on his death certificate. Tonie died in 2002, at age 94.

Selected filmography

Notes
 Copies of some of Lorraine's movies are no longer extant, and there are only brief synopses for some. For others, even story lines and listing of credits are not available.
 During Lorraine's career, there was another actor name Harry Lorraine, an American silent film actor who was noted for comedy and romance films, not action films. Their careers largely overlapped, and due to incomplete records and because the English Harry Lorraine spent time and is thought to filmed movies in the United States, their filmographies have not yet been disambiguated with certainty.

References

1880s births
1934 deaths
English male film actors
English male silent film actors
Male actors from Brighton
20th-century English male actors